Vranjani is a village situated in Požega municipality in Serbia.

References

Populated places in Raška District